Harvey Becker (born May 21, 1960) is a British former professional tennis player.

He reached his career-high singles ranking of World No. 470 in January 1981, and his career-high doubles ranking of World No. 696 in January 1981. He is currently the Head Tennis Professional of High Performance Tennis Academy at Radnor Valley Country Club.

Tennis career
Becker was a successful junior player, who was the UK Junior National Champion. Becker played in the Wimbledon Junior Boys Championships in 1977. He lost in the first round, in three sets, to Ramesh Krishnan, who went on to become the world #1 junior.

Becker played collegiate tennis at Nicholls State University. In 1978, he lost only two matches the entire year and led the then-Division II school to third place in the NCAA Men's Division II Tennis Championship.

From 1980 to 1985, Becker played on the men's tour. He reached a career high in singles of No. 470 and was the No. 13 British male tennis player.

Becker played in The Championships, Wimbledon a total of five times. He lost in the first round of singles qualifying at Wimbledon in 1978, 1979 and 1980. Additionally, he lost in the first round of doubles qualifying in 1979 and 1983.

His only appearance in an ATP main draw was at the 1980 British Hard Court Championships. He was defeated by world No. 76 Shlomo Glickstein in straight sets.

Coaching career
Following his retirement from professional tennis, in 1985, Becker entered the world of tennis coaching. He coached multiple British national teams and served as the director of a British tennis academy. While coaching, Becker worked with a number of Britain's upcoming young talent including Luke Milligan. Becker now coaches in the United States as the Head Tennis Professional of High Performance Tennis Academy at Radnor Valley Country Club.

Grand Slam tournament performance timeline

Singles

Doubles

References

External links 

 

1960 births
Living people
Jewish tennis players
British male tennis players
English male tennis players
Tennis people from Greater London